Prose poetry is poetry written in prose form instead of verse form, while preserving poetic qualities such as heightened imagery, parataxis, and emotional effects.

Characteristics
Prose poetry is written as prose, without the line breaks associated with poetry. However, it makes use of poetic devices such as fragmentation, compression, repetition, rhyme, metaphor, and figures of speech.

History
In 17th-century Japan, Matsuo Bashō originated haibun, a form of prose poetry combining haiku with prose.  It is best exemplified by his book Oku no Hosomichi, in which he used a literary genre of prose-and-poetry composition of multidimensional writing.

In the West, prose poetry originated in early-19th-century France and Germany as a reaction against the traditional verse line. 
The German Romantics Jean Paul, Novalis, Friedrich Hölderlin, and Heinrich Heine may be seen as precursors of the prose poem.  Earlier, 18th-century European forerunners of prose poetry had included James Macpherson's "translation" of Ossian and Évariste de Parny's "Chansons madécasses".
 
At the time of the prose poem's establishment as a form, French poetry was dominated by the alexandrine, a strict and demanding form that poets starting with Maurice de Guérin (whose "Le Centaure" and "La Bacchante" remain arguably the most powerful prose poems ever written ) and Aloysius Bertrand (in Gaspard de la nuit) chose, in almost complete isolation, to cease using. Later Charles Baudelaire, Arthur Rimbaud, and Stéphane Mallarmé followed their example in works like Paris Spleen and Illuminations.  The prose poem continued to be written in France into the 20th century by such writers as Max Jacob, Henri Michaux, Gertrude Stein, and Francis Ponge.

The writings of Syrian poet and writer Francis Marrash (1836–73) featured the first examples of prose poetry in modern Arabic literature.   From the mid-20th century, the great Arab exponent of prose poetry was the Syrian poet Adunis (Ali Ahmad Said Esber, born 1930), a perennial contender for the Nobel Prize in Literature.

The Modernist poet T. S. Eliot wrote vehemently against prose poems. He added to the debate about what defines the genre, writing in his introduction to Djuna Barnes' highly poeticized 1936 novel Nightwood that it could not be classed as "poetic prose" as it did not show the rhythm or "musical pattern" of verse. By contrast, other Modernist authors, including Gertrude Stein and Sherwood Anderson, consistently wrote prose poetry. Canadian author Elizabeth Smart's By Grand Central Station I Sat Down and Wept (1945) is a relatively isolated example of mid-20th-century English-language poetic prose.

Prose poems made a resurgence in the early 1950s and in the 1960s with American poets Allen Ginsberg, Bob Dylan, Jack Kerouac, William S. Burroughs, Russell Edson, Charles Simic, Robert Bly, John Ashbery, and James Wright. Edson worked principally in this form, and helped give the prose poem a reputation for surrealist wit. Simic won the Pulitzer Prize for Poetry for his 1989 collection, The World Doesn't End.

Since the late 1980s, prose poetry has gained in popularity. Journals have begun specializing in prose poems or microfiction. In the United Kingdom, Stride Books published a 1993 anthology of prose poetry, A Curious Architecture.

See also

Rhymed prose
Free verse
Prosimetrum
Lyric essay
Haibun
Fu (poetry)
Gasa (poetry)
Vignette (literature)
Micro-story
Double Room
The English Mail-Coach
Suspiria de Profundis

References

Sources
 Robert Alexander, C.W. Truesdale, and Mark Vinz. "The Party Train: A Collection of North American Prose Poetry." New Rivers Press, 1996.
 Michel Delville, "The American Prose Poem: Poetic Form and the Boundaries of Genre." Gainesville, FL: University of Florida, 1998
 Stephen Fredman, "Poet’s Prose: The Crisis in American Verse." 2nd ed. Cambridge: Cambridge University Press, 1990.
 Ray Gonzalez, "No Boundaries: Prose Poems by 24 American Poets." Tupelo Press, 2003. 
 David Lehman, "Great American prose poems: from Poe to the present."  Simon & Schuster, 2003
 Jonathan Monroe, "A Poverty of Objects: The Prose Poem and the Politics of Genre." Ithaca, N.Y.: Cornell University Press, 1987.
 Margueritte S. Murphy, "A Tradition of Subversion: The Prose Poem from Wilde to Ashbery." Amherst, Mass.: The University of Massachusetts Press, 1992.
 Zygmunt Szweykowski, Twórczość Bolesława Prusa (The Creative Writing of Bolesław Prus), 2nd ed., Warsaw, Państwowy Instytut Wydawniczy, 1972.

External links

 The Prose Poem -International journal-The Berkeley Electronic Press
 Sentence
 Double Room
 William Stafford and David Shumate describe prose poetry
 Poetic Form: Prose Poem inc example by Charles Baudelaire'Be Drunk'

Genres of poetry
Prose